Eli Zuckerman (אלי צוקרמן; also "Zukerman"; born February 8, 1973) is an Israeli competitive sailor.

He was born in Tel Aviv, Israel, and is Jewish.  When Zuckerman competed in the Olympics he was 5-9.5 (177 cm) tall, and weighed 132 lbs (60 kg).

Sailing career
In 1991, he came in 4th in the 420 - Open Scottish Power - International Yacht Racing Union (IYRU) Youth Sailing World Championships in Largs, Scotland.

In 1999 Zuckerman and Eldad Ronen came in 9th in the Men's / Mixed 470 World Championship, in Melbourne, Australia. They were ranked Number 9 in the world during 1999. That year, he won the bronze medal in the 470 - Men XXIV International 470 Spring Cup in Narbonne-Plage, France.

In 2000 he came in 4th in the 470 - Men	Kiel Week, in Kiel, Germany. That year he won the bronze medal in the 470 - Men XXV International 470 Spring Cup in Les Sablettes, La Seyne sur Mer, France.

Zuckerman, at the age of 27, and Eldad Ronen competed for Israel at the 2000 Summer Olympics in Rushcutters Bay Marina, Rose Bay, New South Wales, Australia, in Sailing--Men's 470 Two-Person Dinghy. They came in 13th out of 29 boats.

Coaching career
In 2009, Zuckerman coached Israeli sailors Yoav Levi and Dan Froyliche, who won the silver medal at the 420 Junior Europeans in Lake Balaton, Hungary.  In 2012, he was the manager of the Caesarea Sailing School – Sdot Yam Sailing Club.

He is the Chairman of the Professional Committee of the Israel Sailing Association.

References

External links
 

Jewish sailors (sport)
Sailors at the 2000 Summer Olympics – 470
Jewish Israeli sportspeople
Living people
Olympic sailors of Israel
1973 births
Israeli male sailors (sport)
20th-century Israeli Jews
21st-century Israeli Jews